Liz Flahive is an American playwright, television producer and writer. Beginning her career as a playwright, Flahive wrote two plays, From Up Here and The Madrid. She acted as a producer, executive story editor, and writer on Nurse Jackie, as well as a producer and writer for Homeland. She later co-created, executive produced, and wrote the Netflix comedy GLOW, for which she was nominated for a Primetime Emmy Award for Outstanding Comedy Series in 2018. She also co-wrote the film Adult Beginners and helped write the Marvel film Captain Marvel.

References

External links 

Living people
American women television writers
Women television editors
American women television producers
American television producers
21st-century American women
Year of birth missing (living people)